Narandiba is a municipality (município) in the state of São Paulo in Brazil. The population is 4,904 (2020 est.) in an area of 357 km². The elevation is 419 m.

References

Municipalities in São Paulo (state)